The term "Lichi" may refer to:

Lichi, a genus in the soapberry family
Lichi, Eliseo Alberto's nickname
Lichi Formation, a palaeontological formation in Taiwan
Lichi, a Chinese low speed electric vehicle manufacturer